Smolino may refer to:
Smolino, Poland, a village in Poland
Smolino, Nizhny Novgorod Oblast, an urban-type settlement in Nizhny Novgorod Oblast, Russia
Smolino, name of several rural localilites in Russia